John Joseph Morton (July 22, 1922 – December 17, 1983) was an American football player and coach.  He played in the National Football League (NFL) with the Chicago Bears in 1945 and in the All-America Football Conference (AAFC) with the Los Angeles Dons in 1946 and the Buffalo Bills in 1947  Morton was the head football coach at the University of Toledo for one season, in 1956, compiling a record of 1–7–1.  He served as the defensive line coach for the Green Bay Packers of the NFL from 1957 to 1958.

Head coaching record

References

External links
 
 

1922 births
1983 deaths
American football defensive backs
American football defensive ends
American football ends
Chicago Bears players
Green Bay Packers coaches
Los Angeles Dons players
Missouri Tigers football players
Toledo Rockets football coaches
Purdue Boilermakers football players
Sportspeople from East St. Louis, Illinois
Sportspeople from St. Louis County, Missouri
Players of American football from Illinois
Players of American football from Missouri